This is a list of airlines which have an air operator's certificate issued by the Civil Aviation Authority  of Bahamas.

See also
 List of defunct airlines of the Bahamas
 List of airports in the Bahamas

References

Bahamas
Airlines
Airlines, defunct
Bahamas